Your Face Sounds Familiar is a singing and impersonation competition for celebrities and is based on the Spanish version of the same name. It debuted on March 14, 2015, on ABS-CBN, replacing The Voice of the Philippines. Luis Manzano currently serves as host since Season 3. It was Originally hosted by Billy Crawford for the first two seasons, and for the second season, also co-hosted by Melai Cantiveros. Jed Madela, Gary Valenciano and Sharon Cuneta served as the show's judges for the first two seasons. In Your Face Sounds Familiar Kids, Ogie Alcasid replaces Madela, while Valenciano and Cuneta reprised their roles as judges. The Kids season premiered on January 7, 2017. The show's third season ended on May 30, 2021, and was replaced by Everybody, Sing!.

Development

The Philippine version was first announced by ABS-CBN on its trade show for advertisers in Rockwell Tent, Makati. In this show, 8 celebrities will compete in a song and dance number while impersonating iconic singers. In each week, the "" will assign the artists of whom they will impersonate. When the iconizer is pressed, the icon the contestant is assigned will be shown, along with a preview of the song they have to perform.

The first season of the show took over the timeslot of the second season of The Voice of the Philippines, after its conclusion on March 1, 2015.

Jed Madela, Gary Valenciano and Toni Gonzaga were initially reported to serve as judges for the first season. However Gonzaga was replaced by Sharon Cuneta following Cuneta's return to ABS-CBN on March 9, 2015. Annie Quintos and Georcelle Dapat-Sy were later revealed to help the contestants in impersonating their icons with Quintos coaching the contestants for their vocals and the latter coaching the contestants for choreography.

On April 5, 2015, due to Holy Week, the Week 4 of the first season show only had duets, as Black Saturday pre-empted all special programming.

On April 18–19, 2015, Gary Valenciano temporarily left the show to fulfill his commitment of performing in a series of concerts. He was substituted by Boy Abunda. The same instance happened on May 16–17, 2015, and he was substituted by Vice Ganda.

On June 6, 2015, it was announced that the show will return for a second season in the same year, which premiered on September 12, 2015, taking over the timeslot vacated by the second season of The Voice Kids. In August 2015, Melai Cantiveros, the winner of the first season was announced to co-host the show, impersonating different icons for each week. Sharon Cuneta, Gary Valenciano, Jed Madela, and Billy Crawford were announced to return to the show to reprise their former duties.

In January 2020, ABS-CBN announced that the show will have a third season after Sharon Cuneta renewed her contract with the network. Also, the first Kids season was being re-aired on the primetime slot from March–May 2020 as part of the network's temporary programming changes caused by the Enhanced community quarantine in Luzon. However, the reruns were abruptly stopped after May 3, 2020, due to the temporary closure of ABS-CBN following the cease and desist order issued by the National Telecommunications Commission on account of its franchise expiration.

In December 2020, during the trade launch for 2021 held during the ABS-CBN Christmas Special, it was revealed the show will have a 3rd season, with this season being the first regular season since 2015 after two straight Kids seasons. However, due to Crawford being focused on blocktime shows on TV5, Luis Manzano replaced him as host for Season 3. The third season premiered on February 20, 2021.

On April 4, 2021, due to Holy Week, the Week 7 of the third season was originally going to have duet episodes, as Black Saturday pre-empted all regular programming. but however, as an enhanced community quarantine was reimposed in the Greater Manila Area which resulted in a compilation of Week 1's performances was re-aired instead.

The season's tapings resumed on April 12, 2021, following the downgrade of the enhanced community quarantine, however, Jhong Hilario withdrew from the competition for the safety of his newborn baby.

Format
For 12 or 13 weeks, all the celebrity contestants (four male, four female in some cases groups composed of individuals of either gender) will complete for a cash prize. The contestant with the highest points per week will become the weekly winner, and will win said cash prize. The top four (or more in case of ties) contestants will advance to the finale and compete for the public's votes, where the artist with the most votes will be declared the winner.

However, in Season 3 the format for the finale was changed wherein all remaining contestants advanced to the finale and the winner was determined via a combination of votes cast by the public and the points accumulated by the contestant.

Prizes
The prize given to the weekly winner varied from season to season. In seasons 1 and 2, the weekly winner was given a trophy and a cash prize worth ₱100,000, half of which were donated to a charity chosen by the winner. In Season 3 the weekly winner was still given a trophy, however the cash prize was 50,000 pesos with none being donated to charity.

The Grand Prize is usually composed of a cash prize, a house and lot, and additional prizes, such as tickets to a particular destination. However, the cash prize varied from season to season. In seasons 1–2, the cash prize was worth ₱2,000,000 pesos, with half being donated to the winner's charity of choice. In Season 3 the cash prize was ₱1,000,000.

Spin-off 
On August 15, 2016, Crawford announced that the show will return with a third season; which was later on revealed as a spin-off entitled Your Face Sounds Familiar Kids at the ABS-CBN Trade Launch. On November 22, 2016, Ogie Alcasid, returned to ABS-CBN, and was revealed to be the newest addition to the show's judges, replacing Madela. The first season of the Kids edition premiered on January 7, 2017. It replaced the timeslot of Kapamilya Weekend Specials filler block, which temporarily filled the vacated timeslot of Pinoy Boyband Superstar. Your Face Sounds Familiar Kids has currently run for two seasons and produced two winners, Awra Briguela for its first season and TNT Boys for its second season.

Judges, Hosts and Mentors

Hosts 
Billy Crawford served as the host of Your Face Sounds Familiar during the first two seasons. The winner of the first season, Melai Cantiveros, co-hosted the show along Crawford in season 2. However, since Crawford focused on blocktime shows on TV5, Luis Manzano hosted the third season instead.

Judges
The panel of judges in this show is called "The Jury". In each season there are usually three members of the jury.

In an event that a sitting jury member cannot fulfill their duties for a particular week, a temporary replacement will take their place in that particular week.

Current 
 Sharon Cuneta (seasons 1-)
 Gary Valenciano (seasons 1-)
 Ogie Alcasid (season 3-)

Former 

 Jed Madela (seasons 1–2)

Guest judges
 Boy Abunda (season 1, week 6; season 2, week 3)
 Vice Ganda (season 1, week 10)
 Rico J. Puno (season 2, week 10)
 Karla Estrada (season 2, week 10)
 Randy Santiago (season 2, week 11)
 Annie Quintos (season 2, weeks 6 and 13)
 Georcelle Dapat-Sy (season 2, weeks 6 and 13)
 Jed Madela (season 3, week 7)

Mentors
In every week, two mentors (one for vocals and another for character and movement) helps the contestants in impersonating the icon that was assigned to them.

Current 

Jed Madela (vocals, season 3-)
Nyoy Volante (character and movement, season 3-)

Former 
 Annie Quintos (vocals, seasons 1–2)
 Georcelle Dapat-Sy (character and movement, seasons 1–2)

Series overview

See also
 List of programs broadcast by ABS-CBN

References

External links
 Your Face Sounds Familiar on ABS-CBN
 Your Face Sounds Familiar on Facebook
 Your Face Sounds Familiar on Twitter 
 Your Face Sounds Familiar on Instagram

 
Philippine television series based on Dutch television series
2015 Philippine television series debuts
2021 Philippine television series endings
2020s Philippine television series
Filipino-language television shows